Macrobathra superharpalea is a moth in the  family Cosmopterigidae. It is found on the Seychelles.

References

Natural History Museum Lepidoptera generic names catalog

Macrobathra
Moths described in 1966